The women's moguls competition of the FIS Freestyle Ski and Snowboarding World Championships 2017 was held at Sierra Nevada, Spain on March 8 (qualifying and finals).
34 athletes from 15 countries competed.

Qualification
The following are the results of the qualification.

Final
The following are the results of the finals.

References

Moguls, women's